The 2017–18 Y-League (also known as the Foxtel Y-League for sponsorship reasons) was the tenth season of the Australian Y-League competition.

Teams

In April 2017, the closing of the FFA Centre of Excellence (previously the Australian Institute of Sport Football Program) was announced. They were replaced by Canberra United, who were granted a National Youth League licence.

Format
The 2017–18 season was structured with the same format as the previous two seasons, with the existing ten NYL teams divided into two conferences of five teams: Conference A consists of teams from WA, SA, Victoria and Queensland, while teams from ACT and NSW are in Conference B. Teams in each conference played each other on a home and away basis, followed by a Grand Final between the top team from each conference.

Standings

Results

Positions by round

Group stage

Conference A
Round 1

Round 2

Round 3

Round 4

Round 5

Round 6

Round 7

Round 8

Round 9

Round 10

Conference B
Round 1

Round 2

Round 3

Round 4

Round 5

Round 6

Round 7

Round 8

Round 9

Round 10

Grand Final

Top goalscorers

References

External links
 Official Y·League website

2017–18 A-League season
A-League National Youth League seasons
2017 in Australian soccer
2018 in Australian soccer